Riverleigh is a rural locality in the North Burnett Region, Queensland, Australia.

Geography 
The locality is bounded to the north, west and south by the Burnett River. The land is used for farming.

History 
Riverleigh State School opened 15 October 1913. It was mothballed on 31 December 2009 and closed on 31 December 2010. The school was located at 289 Coonambula-Eidsvold Road. The school's website was archived.

A Methodist church opened at Riverleigh in 1921. In 1928, it was decided to relocate the church building to be nearer to the state school, with the church being re-opened in the new location on Sunday 21 October 1928.

The Monto railway line was extended to Mundubbera on 3 February 1914. The next stage to Ceratodus which passed through Riverleigh was opened on 26 April 1924, with Riverleigh being served by:

 Lacon railway station
 Riverleigh railway station

Riverleigh Apostolic Church opened on Sunday 27 May 1928 by the Reverend Jacob Dietz. The four-acre site included an earlier church and cemetery.

The last train on the Monto railway line was in 2008 and in 2012 the line was officially closed.

Education 
There are no schools in Riverleigh. The nearest school is Mundubbera State School in neighbouring Mundubbera to the east which offers Prep-10 education. For Years 11-12 education, the nearest school is Eidsvold State School at Eidsvold to the north-west.

References 

North Burnett Region
Localities in Queensland